Gorytvesica cosangana is a species of moth of the family Tortricidae. It is found in Napo Province, Ecuador.

The wingspan is 14–17 mm. The forewings are white, the markings consisting of two slender, parallel fasciae. The remaining area is brown ferruginous suffused and strigulated (finely streaked) with brown. The hindwings are creamy brown, reticulated (a net-like pattern) and suffused with grey brown.

Etymology
The species name refers to the type locality, Cosanga.

References

Moths described in 2005
Euliini
Moths of South America
Taxa named by Józef Razowski